Hypancistrocerus is a rather small neotropical genus of potter wasps which is very close to the Genus Stenodynerus. The species included in the genus are:

 Hypancistrocerus abdominalis (Fox, 1902)
 Hypancistrocerus advena (Saussure, 1856)
 Hypancistrocerus anomalicornis (Berton, 1918)
 Hypancistrocerus antennatus (Zavattari, 1912)
 Hypancistrocerus belizensis  (Cameron, 1908)
 Hypancistrocerus carnifer (Kirsch, 1878)
 Hypancistrocerus catamarcensis Brethes, 1903
 Hypancistrocerus coxalis (Fox, 1902)
 Hypancistrocerus dallatorrei (Brethes, 1906)
 Hypancistrocerus dentiformis (Fox, 1902)
 Hypancistrocerus divergens (Zavattari, 1912)
 Hypancistrocerus inusiatus (Fox, 1902)
 Hypancistrocerus reflexus (Fox, 1902)
 Hypancistrocerus torquatus (Zavattari, 1912)

References

Biological pest control wasps
Potter wasps